The Journal of Thrombosis and Haemostasis is a monthly peer-reviewed medical journal covering research on thrombosis and hematology in general. It is published by Wiley-Blackwell and the editors-in-chief are David Lillicrap and James Morrissey. Former editors-in-chief include Frits Rosendaal, Pieter Reitsma, Mike Greaves, David Lane, Pier Mannucci, Jos Vermylen, Jan Sixma, Francois Duckert, and Rosemary Biggs. It is an official journal of the International Society on Thrombosis and Haemostasis.

Abstracting and indexing
According to the Journal Citation Reports, the journal has a 2021 impact factor of 16.036.

References

External links

Hematology journals
English-language journals
Publications established in 2003
Monthly journals
Wiley-Blackwell academic journals